The Eastern Caribbean Supreme Court (ECSC) is a superior court of record for the Organisation of Eastern Caribbean States (OECS), including six independent states: Antigua and Barbuda, the Commonwealth of Dominica, Grenada, Saint Kitts and Nevis, Saint Lucia, Saint Vincent and the Grenadines and three British Overseas Territories (Anguilla, British Virgin Islands, and Montserrat). It has unlimited jurisdiction in each member State.

History
The ECSC was established in 1967 by the West Indies Associated States Supreme Court Order No. 223 of 1967. In relation to Grenada, the Court is styled "the Supreme Court of Grenada and the West Indies Associated States". See section 105 of the Grenada Constitution.

Functions
The functions of the ECSC are as follows:
 To interpret and apply the laws of the various member states of the OECS;
 To decide cases of both civil and criminal matters;
 To hear appeals.

Appeals from the ECSC 
Appeals from the ECSC can be lodged in defined cases to the Judicial Committee of the Privy Council in the United Kingdom (in cases from Antigua and Barbuda, Grenada, Saint Kitts and Nevis, Saint Lucia, Saint Vincent and the Grenadines, Anguilla, British Virgin Islands, and Montserrat) or the Caribbean Court of Justice in Trinidad and Tobago (for cases from Dominica).

Composition

Judges
To be a judge or master of the Eastern Caribbean Supreme Court, a person must have served as a judge in a Commonwealth jurisdiction or be qualified to act as a lawyer in a Commonwealth jurisdiction. An appointee does not need to be a national, judge, or lawyer of a country within the jurisdiction of the Court. The Chief Justice is appointed by the King of the United Kingdom by Letters Patent as advised by the Lord Chancellor. Other judges are appointed on behalf of the King by the Judicial and Legal Services Commission.

High Court Judges and Masters are assigned to reside in and hear cases from a specific member state. It is common for judges to be asked to work in countries other than their home state. Judges are only occasionally assigned to reside in Montserrat and Anguilla—because of the small population of these countries, judges from the other jurisdictions hear cases that arise from these two jurisdictions. The Court of Appeal is itinerant and travels to the various countries to hear appeals.

Judges have life tenure but Justices of Appeal must retire when they are 65 and High Court Judges must retire when they are 62. Extensions of up to three years may be granted by the Judicial and Legal Services Commission only if all of the states agree to such an extension.

Current composition

High Court Judges

Ermin Moise

Nicola Petra Byer
Ann-Marie Smith
Marissa Robertson
Colin Williams
Jan Drysdale

Wynante Adrien-Roberts
Jacqueline Josiah-Graham

Paula Gilford
Victoria Charles-Clarke
Raulston Glasgow
Agnes Actie

Iain Charles Morley, KC

Iain Charles Morley, KC
Patrick Thompson Jr. (Nevis Circuit)

Cadie St. Rose- Albertini
Vivian Georgis Taylor-Alexander
Shawn Innocent
Kimberly Cenac-Phulgence
Rohan Phillip

 

Brian Cottle
Esco Henry
Angelica Teelucksingh

Richard Floyd
Gerhard Wallbank [Ag.]
Adrian Jack [Ag.]

Chief Justices

Location
The Headquarters of the ECSC is in Castries, Saint Lucia, where it is located on the second floor of the Heraldine Rock Building, Block B, on the Waterfront. The building houses the Justices of Appeal's chambers, the Court of Appeal Registry, the Judicial Education Institute, Library, and the Administrative Services.

In addition, there are Court Offices in the nine Member States, which house the chambers of the High Court Judges and the offices of the High Court Registry. Each High Court Registry is headed by a legally trained Registrar who provides the necessary administrative and legal support for the functioning of the High Court.

Notable people
 

David Courtenay Harris, High Court Judge

See also
Organisation of Eastern Caribbean States
Judicial Committee of the Privy Council (JCPC)
Caribbean Court of Justice

References

External links
Eastern Caribbean Supreme Court website

 
Organisation of Eastern Caribbean States
Law in the Caribbean
International supreme courts
International courts and tribunals
Courts and tribunals established in 1967
Antigua and Barbuda court system
Law of Dominica
Law of Grenada
Law of Saint Kitts and Nevis
Law of Saint Lucia
Law of Saint Vincent and the Grenadines
Anguillan law
British Virgin Islands law
Montserratian law
1960s establishments in the Caribbean